Vitis × champinii, or Champin's grape, is a hybrid grape resulting from the natural hybridization of Vitis mustangensis with Vitis rupestris.  Its native range is the Edwards Plateau in Texas.

References

 
 USDA Natural Resources Conservation Service, PLANTS Profile for Vitis × champinii Munson ex Viala (pro sp.) (rupestris × mustangensis).

champinii
Plants described in 1882
Hybrid grape varieties
Plant nothospecies